Rowden Mill railway station was a railway station located on the Worcester, Bromyard and Leominster Railway in England.

Opening
Opened as part of the final section of the Worcester, Bromyard and Leominster Railway, the railway was bought out of bankruptcy by the Great Western Railway in 1888, who completed the line in 1897.

Closure
Post the Second World War, and with the greater use of the motorbus and private cars, traffic on the line fell considerably. Unstaffed as a station from September 1949, the line closed to regular passenger services on 15 September 1952.

The 50 society members/passengers rode on the last train that would run on the complete track before it was removed. The Worcester to Bromyard section, kept open for the storage of disused and soon to be scrapped railway wagons, was closed under the Beeching Axe in 1964.

Present

Rowden Mill was bought and restored from 1984,. 
Sections of the track either side of station were also reinstalled. Rolling stock of various types including coaches, brake vans and goods vans have been located on the line at various times in the recent past.
In March 1989, Rowden Mill received the British Rail Award in the Ian Allan Publishing Railway Heritage Awards for the Best Renovated Non-Working station.
Rowden Mill Station now operates as a holiday letting business, making the station buildings available as accommodation to visiting guests.

References

Further reading

Disused railway stations in Herefordshire
Former Great Western Railway stations
Railway stations in Great Britain opened in 1897
Railway stations in Great Britain closed in 1952